Loud (stylized as LOUD) is a Brazilian esports organisation with teams competing in Free Fire, Fortnite, League of Legends and Valorant. Founded in 2019, LOUD is the esports organization with the largest number of followers on social media in Brazil and the second largest in the world. In 2022, LOUD's Valorant team won Best Esports Team at Esports Awards and The Game Awards.

History 
LOUD was created on February 28, 2019 by YouTuber Bruno "PlayHard" Oliveira along with entrepreneurs Jean Ortega and Mathew Ho. Since the beginning, LOUD has focused on creating videos on YouTube and popularizing its players and influencers. Being one of the pioneers of this model in Brazil, LOUD became the first Brazilian esports organization to reach 1 billion views.

On October 28, 2022, LOUD announced the digital influencer Iran Ferreira, better known as Luva de Pedreiro, as an ambassador. Before joining LOUD, Iran was already popularly known around the world, especially in the football scene, where he has already received attention from players like Neymar and Cristiano Ronaldo.

Partnerships and collaborations 
In August 2021, LOUD stamped the new packaging of Fusion Energy Drink, an Ambev brand of energy drinks. In January 2023, Burger King launched a LOUD-themed restaurant in São Paulo for 1 month.

Current divisions

Free Fire 
LOUD started as a Free Fire team, due to the popularization of the game in Brazil in 2019. LOUD's Free Fire team won the 2020 Copa America and the 2022 Liga Brasileira de Free Fire Stage 1.

Current roster

League of Legends 
Its League of Legends team competes in the Campeonato Brasileiro de League of Legends (CBLOL), Brazil's top professional league for the game. On 3 September 2022, LOUD swept paiN Gaming to win its first CBLOL title, qualifying the team for the 2022 World Championship.

Current roster

Valorant 
LOUD arrived on the Valorant scene in early 2022 by signing a free agent team named "paNcada e amigos". LOUD's Valorant team won the 2022 Valorant Champions, the culmination of that year's Valorant Champions Tour, the game's most prestigious international tournament.

Current roster

Former divisions

Fortnite 
In June 2020, LOUD started playing Fortnite competitions. Throughout, there were seven players who passed through the organization. In November 2022, LOUD announced their departure from the competitive Fortnite scene.

Awards and nominations

References 

2019 establishments in Brazil
Esports teams based in Brazil
Esports teams established in 2019
Campeonato Brasileiro de League of Legends teams
Valorant teams
The Game Awards winners